Guns of the Timberland is a 1960 American Technicolor lumberjack Western film directed by Robert D. Webb and starring Alan Ladd, Jeanne Crain, Gilbert Roland and Frankie Avalon.

Plot
Logger Jim Hadley and his lumberjack crew are looking for new forest to cut. They locate a prime prospect outside the town of Deep Wells. The town's residents, led by Laura Riley, are opposed to the felling of the trees, believing that losing them would cause mudslides during the heavy rains.

Cast
 Alan Ladd as Jim Hadley
 Jeanne Crain as Laura Riley
 Gilbert Roland as Monty Welker
 Frankie Avalon as Bert Harvey
 Lyle Bettger as Clay Bell
 Noah Beery Jr. as Blackie (as Noah Beery)
 Verna Felton as Aunt Sarah
 Alana Ladd as Jane Peterson
 Regis Toomey as Sheriff Taylor
 Johnny Seven as Vince
 George Selk as Amos Stearns
 Paul E. Burns as Bill Burroughs
 Henry Kulky as Logger

Production

Development
Louis L'Amour's novel Guns of the Timberlands was published in 1955 and sold more than one million copies.  Alan Ladd's film production company Jaguar optioned the novel that same year. The working title for the film was "Shasta."

In 1957, it was announced the film would be produced from a script by David Victor and Herbert Little, with Albert J Cohen as producer. Ladd had worked with Aaron Spelling on two TV pilots, and Spelling's work so impressed Ladd that he made Spelling a producer on the picture. Robert Webb was signed to direct.

Ladd offered a lead role to Van Heflin, hoping to reunite with his costar from Shane. He also wanted to cast Raymond Burr. Jeanne Crain and Gilbert Roland were signed to support Ladd, along with the Ladds' daughter Alana.

Frankie Avalon, following his recent hit single Venus, signed to make his dramatic debut in the film. Avalon later said, "I'm sure the reason why Warner Bros. said, 'Let's get this kid' is that he has lots of fans out there and he's getting 12,000 to 15,000 fans letters a week. 'Let's put him in a picture with a guy like Alan Ladd'." Avalon's performance led to his casting in The Alamo.

Shooting
Filming started in April 1959 on location in and around Blairsden, California, Graeagle, California and other locations throughout Plumas County.  The scenes involving the steam engine and railroad cars were shot on the Western Pacific Railroad right-of-way.  The scene in which the steam engine goes over the tall "bridge" pictured the Clio Trestle.

Filming finished in June 1959.

Music 
In the film, Avalon sings two songs, "The Faithful Kind" and "Gee Whiz Whillikins Golly Gee." Both were released as a 45-rpm single in 1960.

References

Bibliography

External links
 
 
 Guns of the Timberland at TCMDB
 

1960 films
1960s English-language films
Warner Bros. films
Films directed by Robert D. Webb
Films scored by David Buttolph
1960 drama films
Films based on American novels
Films based on Western (genre) novels
American drama films
Films based on works by Louis L'Amour
Films set in forests
Films about lumberjacks
1960s American films